The International Zoo Educators Association (IZE) is a non-profit organization dedicated to improving the education programmes in zoos and aquariums.

Founded in 1972 by a group of European zoo educators, IZE's aim was to create a forum where zoo educators could meet every two years to discuss and share ideas and common interests. The founding members included those from Frankfurt Zoo, Amsterdam Zoo, Paignton Zoo and Copenhagen Zoo.

The first IZE President was Rosl Kirchshofer, head of education at the Frankfurt Zoo.

Proceedings were produced for the first time at the second international meeting in 1974 at Copenhagen Zoo. To facilitate communication among members the first newsletter was produced in 1977, edited by Jan Hatley, head of education at Paignton Zoo.

The IZE website states that the association's mission is to:

"[...expand] the educational impact of zoos and aquariums worldwide", "improve the education programs" and "support excellence in animal care and welfare".

History
The International Zoo Educators Association was established after a meeting of zoo education officers held in Frankfurt, Germany on September 6, 1972.

Newsgroup
In November 1999 a group of IZE European members began a European regional internet discussion group to help educators network between conferences. This group started life as the ERNIZE Yahoo Group managed by staff at Chester Zoo in England, UK. In June 2007 the IZE Board voted to make the group international and available to IZE members worldwide. The name changed to the IZE Yahoo Group and its management transferred to Edinburgh Zoo in Scotland. Membership of the group is by invitation-only and its primary purpose is ‘to enable discussion, exchange of information and questions etc. between zoo educators across the world’.

Institutional membership and sponsored delegates
IZE offers institutional membership to zoos, aquariums, nature/wildlife centres and wildlife reserves. At least 50% of this annual membership fee is used in a scheme to enable sponsored delegates to attend conferences when they might not otherwise be able to afford to, and supports outreach to zoo and wildlife educators in the developing world.

Sponsored delegates must be qualified to seek full membership and be unable to pay regular membership fees. Sponsored membership applications must be approved by the Regional Representatives and IZE President. Approved members are entitled to all rights and privileges of full membership for two years.

Relationship with WAZA
Every year since 2000, IZE has reported to the World Association of Zoos and Aquariums about their achievements to realize the education goals formulated in the World Zoo and Aquarium Conservation Strategy.

In 2002 IZE became an affiliate member of WAZA.

In 2004 an IZE Central Office was established after a proposal to WAZA for assistance. It was decided during the 2004 WAZA Conference in Taipei, Taiwan to offer room, equipment and a one-day a week staff member in their headquarters at this time in Bern, Switzerland, giving IZE a stable base for all kinds of activities. This also increased the efficiency of the management of IZE membership dues, allowing more sponsored delegates to attend the IZE Conferences. Since 2009, IZE has made a contribution towards the running costs of the headquarters.

Under a MoU, the WAZA's Executive Office provides secretariat support to the IZE. In 2010, the Association separated from the WAZA office in order to better serve their members. The IZE Administrator position is a paid position and is now selected and works for the IZE President and in support of the President on all matters for the Association specifically  membership, tracking financial statements and note keeping on Board communications. The Association now manages its own membership and membership dues in an extremely efficient manner and continues to make the IZE Journal and IZE Grants Program a priority of funding.

Formalisation of Statutes under Swiss law in 2006
Under the name "International Zoo Educators Association" (IZE) exists, for an indefinite period of time, an association under the terms of articles 60 to 78 of the Swiss Civil Code. The association is a non-profit organization with international membership. The association office is located in Bern, Switzerland.

The IZE Constitution was adopted and put into force by the General Assembly at the 18th Biennal Conference in Pretoria, South Africa on 13 October 2006. It is revised annually and proposed changes are voted on by the General Assembly during the IZE Conferences.

Website
The IZE's website was first launched in 2001 with a major overhaul taking place in 2005.

Journals
The first Newsletter of the International Association of Zoo Educators was produced after the third conference in 1976. It was edited by Jan Hatley, head of education at Paignton Zoo, and published in 1977. The aim of the newsletter was to facilitate communication among members between conferences.

The newsletter was redesigned and edited for economic reasons with the help of Judith White and Judith King of the National Zoo in Washington, D.C., and the sixth issue was published in 1981.

In 1986 the newsletter became the Journal of the International Association of Zoo Educators as suggested by Judith King:

The Journal describes itself as a resource for articles on conservation, interpretation, zoo education, methods and techniques, and evaluation. Its publication has been annual since 1999.

List of journals

List of conferences

List of presidents

 Rosl Kirchshofer (Frankfurt Zoo, Germany; 1972 - 1976)
 Han Rensenbrink (Amsterdam Zoo, Netherlands; 1976 - 1980)
 Jan Hatley (Paignton Zoo, England; 1980 - 1984)
 Judith White (National Zoo, United States; 1984 - 1988)
 Lars Lunding Andersen (Copenhagen Zoo, Denmark; 1988 - 1992)
 Robert Ollason (Edinburgh Zoo, Scotland; 1992 - 1996)
 Pegi Harvey (San Diego Zoo, United States; 1996 - 2000)
 Annette Berkovits (Bronx Zoo, United States; 2000 - 2004)
 Chris Peters (Rotterdam Zoo, The Netherlands; 2004 - 2006)
 Stephen McKeown (Chester Zoo, England; 2006 - October 2010)
 Kathy Lehnhardt (Disney's Animal Kingdom, United States; October 2010 - 2012)
 Rachel Lowry (Zoos Victoria, Australia; 2013-2016)
 Isabel Li (Ocean Park, Hong Kong; 2016 - 2018)
 Debra Erickson (San Diego Zoo Global, USA; 2018–present day)

See also 
 List of zoo associations

Notes

References

External links 
 

Zoo associations